Don't Get Mad Get Money is a second studio album by American hardcore rapper Fredro Starr, best known as a member of multi-platinum hardcore rap group Onyx, released on May 20, 2003 by D3 Entertainment.

The album was produced by Kronic Tones, Porky, Fredro Starr, Hector Delgado and Ess. The album features appearances by American rappers Sticky Fingaz, X1, Begetz, Still Livin' and Dirty Get-Inz.

The album debuted at number 99 on the US Top R&B/Hip Hop Albums chart on June 14, 2003.

The album was released on D3 Entertainment, owned by the label Riviera Entertainment.

Critical response

Donnie Kwak of Vibe gave the album two and a half stars out of five, saying "...After lukewarm responses to his solo debut, "Firestarr", and last year's forgettable Onyx reunion, "Bacdafucup Part II", Fredro Starr tries his hand at more radio friendly step-alongs on "Don't Get Mad Get Money". Songs like "Finer Things", with its Ashanti-like chorus, and "California Girls", which mimics the Neptunes down to the falsetto crooning on the hook, expose the overtly pop direction. Starr's flow, however, remains polished (along with protege Icarus's). But after the production retreads and the tired threats and punch lines, "Don't Get Mad... doesn't get even."

Steve 'Flash' Juon of RapReviews gave the album seven stars out of ten, and stated "...Last time around Fredro Starr tried to do his own production, but this time he wisely passes the torch to cats like Porky and Kronic Tones. Never heard of them? You'll get to know the latter from his Just Blaze/Kanye West style work on "Pranksta," his melodic grit on "All Out" featuring Sticky Fingaz and X1, the smoothed out title track and the ominous "Reaper's Anthem." Porky's work on "California Girls" shines, but he also handles the bouncy flute of "Finer Things" nicely and still blasts it out for the streets on "Timberlands," Fredro's free advertisement for his favorite kicks."

Singles 
The one and only single, "California Girls" featuring Dirty Get-inz and Felisa Marisol was released on May 6, 2003. The video shows some kind of party near the pool.

Track listing

Personnel 
Credits for Don't Get Mad Get Money adapted from AllMusic and CD booklet.

 Fredro Starr — performer, vocals, producer ("Where's The Love"), executive producer
 Sticky Fingaz — guest artist, executive producer
 X1 — guest artist
 David «Begetz» Cooper — guest artist
 Dirty Get-Inz — guest artist
 Still Livin' — backing vocals
 T Hussle — backing vocals
 Felisa Marisol — backing vocals

 Kronic Tones — producer
 Porky — producer
 Ess — producer
 Omar «Iceman» Sharif — executive producer
 Hector Delgado — recording, mixing, producer ("Where's The Love")
 Jonathan Mannion — photographer
 Debra Young — photographer
 Brian Porizek — art direction, design
 Aldy Damian — label direction
 M3 — remix

Charts

References

External links 
 Don't Get Mad Get Money at Discogs
 Don't Get Mad Get Money at RapGenius
 

Fredro Starr albums
2003 albums